Pigeon Lake Regional School is a public grade 7–12 middle and high school in Falun, Alberta, and a part of Wetaskiwin Regional Division No. 11. It serves Falun, Pipestone, Westerose,  the Pigeon Lake area, the reserve of Ma-Me-O Beach First Nations, the Maskwacis (formerly Hobbema) reserve, the Louis Bull Reserve, and the Pigeon Lake Reserve.  it had about 300 students.

References

External links
 Pigeon Lake Regional School
Middle schools in Alberta
High schools in Alberta
County of Wetaskiwin No. 10